Pteroma plagiophleps is a moth of the family Psychidae first described by George Hampson in 1892. It is found in India, Bangladesh, Sri Lanka, and Indonesia.

Description
Sexes show strong sexual dimorphism. The male has a wingspan of 14–16 mm. It is a brownish moth. Female is wingless and found within a case with a sclerotized posterior part. The fully grown larva is about 9–10 mm long and found inside a movable case. After mating, females lay eggs within its case. Each female can produce about 110 to 200 eggs. Soon after hatching, a larva starts to make a case using leaves of the host plant. Late instars move to the branches and stem of the plant and start to eat leaves and bark. Bark feeding and scorched leaf appearance is common during heavy infestation.

Ecology
Larval host plants are Acacia nilotica, Delonix regia, Falcataria moluccana, Terminalia catappa, Acacia auriculiformis, Acacia mangium, Syzygium cumini, Populus deltoides, Tectona grandis, Trema orientalis and Rhizophora mucronata.

References

External links
Biology, infestation characteristics and impact of the bagworm, Pteroma plagiophleps Hamps. in forest plantations of Paraserianthes falcataria
Variations in the wing venation of Pteroma plagiophleps Hampson (Lepidoptera: Psychidae)
Host range, suitability of host plants as food, and seasonal abundance of the bagworm moth, Pteroma plagiophleps Hamps (Lepidoptera: Psychidae) in Bangladesh
Herbivorous Insects Associated with Albizia (Falcataria moluccana) Saplings in Bogor

Moths of Asia
Moths described in 1892
Psychidae